Type 53 is the common name for a family of 53 cm (21 inch) torpedoes manufactured in Russia, starting with the 53-27 torpedo and continuing to the modern UGST (Fizik-1), which is being replaced by the Futlyar.

With the exception of the UGST which uses Mark 48 style monopropellants, Soviet 53 cm torpedoes generally use electric power (since middle of World War II), or kerosene mixed with various oxidizers for propulsion. Russian torpedoes are often named descriptively for their characteristics – examples include "acoustic homing" or "electric torpedo", all in Russian acronyms.

History

Early history

In 1932 USSR bought in Italy several types of torpedoes, and the  model of Whitehead plant in Fiume (in the Soviet Union it was designated 53F) was considered superior. After adapting several features from the latter in unsuccessful 53-36 the decision was made to copy 53F.

World War II

The 53-38/53-38U, which had entered service in 1938–1939, were the main Soviet torpedoes in World War II; they proved to be fairly reliable and effective. The two deadliest sinkings in history (the German 25,484-ton military transport  and the troop transport ) were performed by two Soviet submarines using 53-38s on 30 January and 16 April 1945; both ships were hit on first attempt and sank within minutes in despite of difficult visibility conditions and the presence of escorts. Notably, all three torpedoes launched against Wilhelm Gustloff hit and exploded with catastrophic results, not a common feat in those times and conditions.

Another notable sinking with 53-38/53-38Us was the 14,660-ton . During the Black Sea campaigns (1941–44), Soviet submarines sank at least 29,000 tons of enemy shipping, mostly using mines, shellfire and 53-38 torpedoes.

The new 53-39 (entering service in 1941) was very fast and effective but only available in limited numbers, while the ET-80 (1942–1943) was the first Soviet electric torpedo and crews did not trust it because of its teething and rushed induction problems.

Cold War

The first Soviet torpedo with passive-homing capability was the SAET-50 (1950), which was an anti-ship weapon used on submarines. The 53-61 was the first Soviet homing torpedo to exceed 40 knots.

The 53-65 torpedo family are Russian made, wake-homing torpedoes designed to destroy surface ships. The 53-65 became operational in 1965, while the 53-65K and 53-65M both became operational in 1969. The 53-65KE is an exported version. China received an unknown number of 53-65KE torpedoes from Russia after purchasing four s in the 1990s.

The Type 53-65 torpedo is considered especially threatening by the United States Navy because they do not respond to usual torpedo countermeasures. Wake homing torpedoes have caused the U.S. Navy to develop the Surface Ship Torpedo Defense (SSTD) system that employs a maneuvering Countermeasure Anti-Torpedo (CAT) that seeks and intercepts an incoming torpedo.

UGST
It differs from most previous Soviet and Russian torpedoes in that unlike the previously dominant electric or peroxide propulsion, it uses the Otto fuel axial engine, which allows it to have much extended range while keeping the speeds of up to 65 knots. It also features an updated homing system, which, in addition to the traditional passive wake homing, features a phased array active sonar and an improved wire guidance system: previous Soviet torpedoes had the guidance wire spool in the torpedo body, with the wire released through the hollow propeller shaft, which had the disadvantage of the wire being prone to breakage, while the UGST has the wire release port on the side. Together with the towed extender spool, kept in the calmer portion of the wake, this makes the wire much more durable than before, though not as durable as the tube mounted spool (not used by the Soviets/Russian Navy as it interferes with the automatic reload systems). It was supposed to enter service in the 1990s, but the teething problems and the lack of funding during that period made the deployment sluggish, and it entered the widespread service only in the 2015 by the Fizik name, being quickly replaced by the new-generation Futlyar (Fizik-2). Sources refer to them as heat-seeking torpedoes.

Variants

 53-27L (First produced variant)
 53-38/53-38U/53-59/53-56V and -56VA (Standard straight-running Soviet torpedo of WWII)
 53-51 (First Soviet torpedo with pattern-running ability)
 53-57/53-58/53-61 (Primary torpedo development family in the post-war era)
 53-65/53-65K and -65KE/TT-3 (First mass-produced wake homing Soviet torpedo, included engine improvements)
 SAET-50 (First Soviet anti-ship homing torpedo)
 SET-53/SAET-53 (First Soviet anti-submarine homing torpedo)
 SAET-60/SAET-60M (Anti-ship homing torpedo, improvement over the SET-53 development)
 SET-65 Enot/SET-65M Enot 2 (First effective Soviet anti-submarine homing torpedo, active/passive homing)
 TEST-71 (Standard Soviet/Russian wire guided torpedo, active/passive homing)
 UGST (A 'universal' thermal torpedo, with pumpjet propulsor, active/passive homing)
 USET-80 (Current Russian submarine and surface ship torpedo, active/passive/wake homing)

53-65 specifications
 Primary function: ASUW torpedo
 Power plant:
 53-65 and 53-65M: Kerosene-hydrogen peroxide turbine
 53-65K: Kerosene-oxygen turbine
 Length: 
 Weight: 
 Diameter: 
 Range:
 53-65: 
 53-65K: 
 53-65M: 
 Speed:
 53-65 and 53-65K: 45 kn (52 mi/h, 83 km/h)
 53-65M: 44 kn (51 mi/h, 81 km/h)
 Guidance system: Wake homing
 Operational since:
 53-65: 1965
 53-65K and 53-65M: 1969

References

External links
Site with information about Russian torpedoes

Torpedoes of Russia
Torpedoes of the Soviet Union
Cold War weapons of the Soviet Union